Panaeolina is a small genus of small mushrooms, containing only about four species.  They are a subgroup of Panaeolus which have dark brown spores.  The type species is Panaeolina foenisecii, a common lawn mushroom.  Members of Panaeolina are broadly distributed throughout the world.

Some members of Panaeolina have been reported to contain the hallucinogen psilocybin, however these results are thought to be false positives.

These fungi are sometimes classified as part of the genus Panaeolus. Like that genus their gills have a cloudy/speckled/mottled appearance due to the way that their spores ripen unevenly in spots, but they are distinguished because the spores are ornamented while those of Panaeolus (in the restricted sense) are smooth.  Also their gills are dark brown, instead of black or grey.

Notable species
 Panaeolina foenisecii (very common)
 Panaeolina rhombisperma
 Panaeolina sagarae
 Panaeolina microsperma

References

External links
 Wikispecies - The Genus Panaeolina
  (on Fondazione Museo Civico di Rovereto)
 Info on Panaeolina foenisecii intoxication

Bolbitiaceae
Agaricales genera
Taxa named by René Maire